Thomas Francis Hendricken (May 5, 1827 – June 11, 1886) was an Irish-born American prelate of the Roman Catholic Church.  He served as the first bishop of the Diocese of Providence in Rhode Island from 1872 until his death in 1886.

Biography

Early life 
Thomas Hendricken was born on May 5, 1827 in Kilkenny, Ireland, the third child of John and Anne Meagher Hendricken's six children, three of whom died young. His father descended from a German officer who had fought for James Butler, 2nd Duke of Ormonde at the Battle of the Boyne in Ireland. John Hendricken died in 1835.

Hendricken studied in St Kieran's College and in 1847 entered St Patrick's College, Maynooth.  While in Maynooth,  Bishop Bernard O'Reilly recruited him to immigrate to the United States and serve in the Diocese of Hartford.  At that time, the diocese  consisted of the states of Connecticut and Rhode Island.

Priesthood 
Bishop O'Reilly ordained Hendricken to the priesthood on April 25, 1853, at All Hallows College in  Dublin. Onboard the steamer Columbia sailing to the United States, Hendricken disobeyed the captain by entering the steerage area to tend to a dying woman who had requested last rites. The captain, president of a Know Nothing lodge in Maine and fearing the spread of disease, beat Hendricken unconscious.  He would have thrown him overboard, but a Protestant clergyman rallied his group of German immigrants to protest. The Germans kept Hendricken safe for the remainder of the voyage.

Upon arrival in Providence, Rhode Island, Hendricken was first assigned to the Cathedral of Saints Peter and Paul in Providence, Rhode Island. He was then transferred to a pastoral position at to St. Joseph's Parish in Providence. Hendricken's next assignments were to St. Charles Borromeo Parish in Woonsocket, Rhode Island, and St. Mary's Parish in Newport, Rhode Island. Architect Patrick Keely was hired to designs churches for St. Joseph's in 1848 and St. Mary's in 1851. In 1854, Hendricken was appointed pastor of St. Joseph's Parish in West Winsted, Connecticut, before being assigned the following July to St. Peter's Parish in Waterbury, Connecticut. His sister Catherine and brother William later joined him there.

Hendricken hired Keely to design a new, larger church. Built of red brick, with a tall spire, it stood on East Main Street. When it was dedicated by Bishop Patrick McFarland, it was renamed in honor of the Immaculate Conception, the first church in the United States to bear that title since the 1854 decree.

In 1869, Hendricken persuaded the Congregation of Notre Dame of Montreal to come to the parish, where they established Notre Dame Academy, a day and boarding school for girls. He also purchased land for St. Joseph's Cemetery. In 1868, he accompanied one of his parishioners to the Séminaire de Saint-Hyacinthe in Quebec, where the sixteen-year-old Michael J. McGivney began his studies for the priesthood. In 1870, Hendricken became a naturalized citizen.

Bishop of Providence 
On February 16, 1822, Hendricken was appointed the first bishop of the new Diocese of Rhode Island. He was consecrated by Cardinal John McCloskey in Providence on April 28, 1972. At that time, the diocese included all of Rhode Island, as well as the present Diocese of Fall River and the islands of Martha's Vineyard and Nantucket, all in Massachusetts.  The new diocese had 125,000 parishioners, 43 churches, nine parish schools and one orphan asylum.

Hendricken created 13 English and two French-speaking parishes for growing populations of French-Canadians and Irish. By 1873, the immigration into the diocese slowed and the post-war boom ended with many of his flock unemployed or on reduced wages.

Hendricken again hired Keely, this time to design the Cathedral of SS Peter and Paul, although he died before its completion in 1878.

Death and legacy 
Thomas Hendricken died at the episcopal residence in Providence on June 11, 1886 at age 59. His funeral was the first mass to be celebrated in the new cathedral, and he was entombed in a crypt beneath the high altar.

Bishop Thomas Francis Hendricken High School in Warwick, Rhode Island is named after him. Hendricken was named to the Rhode Island Heritage Hall in 2006.

During cathedral renovations in 2006, the basement crypt was removed, and the remains of the bishops were re-interred in a mausoleum at a nearby diocesan cemetery. Hendricken, however, was re-entombed on December 8, 2006 in a sarcophagus located on the cathedral's main floor, in the West Transept. Eight seniors from the high school that bears his name carried Hendricken's remains to a resting place facing the high altar.

References

External links
Profile, catholic-hierarchy.org; accessed March 11, 2017.

Episcopal succession

1827 births
1886 deaths
Irish emigrants to the United States (before 1923)
People from County Kilkenny
19th-century Irish Roman Catholic priests
19th-century Roman Catholic bishops in the United States
Roman Catholic bishops of Providence
Alumni of St Patrick's College, Maynooth